Nanorien Stones is an adventure for fantasy role-playing games published by Mayfair Games in 1982.

Contents
Nanorien Stones is an adventure into the four Elemental Planes.  It includes descriptions of 20 new monsters, each illustrated.  According to the publisher it is also suitable for use with Dungeons & Dragons and Tunnels & Trolls.

In this adventure, the player characters journey to the four elemental planes in search of the magical "Nanorien Stones," then retrieve them and return to the Prime Material Plane. The characters pass through a strange archway; once through, they begin their search on the plane of Earth.

Publication history
Nanorien Stones was written by Jim Gallagher and Steve Morrison, and was published by Mayfair Games in 1982 as a 32-page book.

Mayfair Games kicked off its Role Aids game line with Beastmaker Mountain (1982), Nanorien Stones (1982) and Fez I (1982).

Reception
Kelly Grimes and Aaron Allston reviewed Nanorien Stones in The Space Gamer #58. They noted that the quest "starts out with a beautiful narrative to be read to the players to set the mood and provide background" but that "the adventure becomes progressively harder, making it an almost certain killer adventure before it ends. And when it does end, it leaves the players hanging, returning the characters to the prime material plane with little reward for their efforts." The detailed the adventure's "many and varied" flaws, including some of the "petty and mean" encounters and that "this unpleasantness is predetermined; it happens without the character's actions making a difference". Grimes and Allston concluded the review by saying: "This module isn't for everyone. In fact, it's doubtful that it's for anyone. With a great deal more work, it might be fun, but the buyer would be well-advised to leave this one sitting on the shelf."

References

Fantasy role-playing game adventures
Role Aids
Role-playing game supplements introduced in 1982